The Ambassador Extraordinary and Plenipotentiary of the Russian Federation to the French Republic is the official representative of the President and the Government of the Russian Federation to the President and the Government of France.

The ambassador and his staff work at large in the Embassy of Russia in France. There are consulates general in Strasbourg and Marsailles, an honorary consul in Lyon, and a vice-consulate in Biarritz. The Russian ambassador to France is concurrently accredited as ambassador to Monaco, where there is an honorary consul general.

History of diplomatic relations

Russian-French contacts began on August 9, 1717, when Hans Christoph Shleynits, the first Russian ambassador to France, was appointed by Tsar Peter I of Russia and presented his credentials to King Louis XV of France. France responded by sending its first ambassador to Russia, Jacques de Campredon, in September 1721. Since then, relations were fairly constant between the two countries, although they were severed and restored many times. Overall, relations between France and Russia have been very close, and French was even considered the unofficial second language of Russia in the 18th and 19th centuries.

Relations between the two countries were severed in 1733 with the start of the War of the Polish Succession and resumed in 1738. Poor relations between the revolutionary government of France and the Russian Monarchy led to relations being severed in 1792. The Napoleonic Wars marked the start of new conflicts between Russia and France, and relations were not restored until the conclusion of the War of the Second Coalition between Russia and France in 1800. The War of the Third Coalition in 1805 led to the disruption of diplomatic relations once again, which were not restored until the signing of the Treaty of Paris on November 20, 1815. Russia and France conflicted over different views on the Revolutions of 1848 and the French support of revolutions in multinational countries. This led to the Crimean War on March 27, 1854, which ended with a Russian defeat on March 30, 1856. Relations between the two countries improved after that, and remained uninterrupted until the October Revolution of 1917. 

French Prime Minister Édouard Herriot sent a telegram to Alexey Rykov, the President of the Council of People's Commissars of the USSR, on October 26, 1924, informing him of the French recognition of the establishment of the Soviet Union. When Germany declared war on the Soviet Union on June 30, 1941, the Vichy France government broke off diplomatic relations with the Soviet Union, but never officially entered a state of war. Relations were reestablished on October 23, 1944, with the Soviet recognition of the new Provisional Government of the French Republic. Since then, relations between the new nations remained unbroken, although they were strained at times during the Cold War.

After the breakup of the Soviet Union, relations between France and the new Russian Federation were warm, and France recognized Russia as the successor of the USSR on February 7, 1992.

List of representatives (1711 – present)

Representatives of the Tsardom of Russia to the Kingdom of France (1711 – 1721)

Representatives of the Russian Empire to the Kingdom of France (1721 – 1792)

Representatives of the Russian Empire to the First French Empire (1800 – 1812)

Representatives of the Russian Empire to the Kingdom of France (1814 – 1852)

Representatives of the Russian Empire to the Second French Empire (1852 – 1870)

Representatives of the Russian Empire to the French Third Republic (1871 – 1917)

Representatives of the Russian Provisional Government to the French Third Republic (1917)

Representatives of the Soviet Union to the Republic of France (1924–1991)

Representatives of the Russian Federation to France (1991 - present)

References

 
France
Russia